Arnaldo Coro Antích (2 July 1942 – 8 January 2023) was a Cuban radio host, academic and popular amateur radio operator. He was a cofounder of Radio Havana and hosted the English language Radio Habana show DXers Unlimited which broadcasts twice a week. He was also a professor of broadcasting at the University of Havana.

His amateur radio call sign was CO2KK. In Cuba, Coro is considered "the guru of ham radio operators" and is credited with increasing interest in Cuban amateur radio operation and garnered many fans in the United States. Due to the difficulty in acquiring radio equipment, Coro assembled his radio equipment from pieces of old radios, Soviet-era television sets and fax machines.

Coro became interested in long-distance transmission as a child when his father bought a television set, after which he got into TV DX. While on a 48-hour leave from his military duties, he witnessed a Douglas B-26 Invader finishing a strafing run on an airport near his home, alerting him to the start of the Bay of Pigs Invasion. Coro was also involved in the capturing of prisoners, some of whom were former schoolmates, in the Zapata Swamp. 

Coro died on 8 January 2023, at the age of 80.

References

Sources

  Audio of Arnaldo Coro Antich interview (RealPlayer)

External links
Transcripts of DXers Unlimited (RHC - Radio Havana Cuba; engl.)
QRZ Ham radio callsign database - CO2KK

1942 births
2023 deaths
Amateur radio people
Cuban radio presenters
University of Havana people